Norifumi is a masculine Japanese given name. Notable people with the name include:

, Japanese motorcycle road racer, previously a 500 cc/MotoGP rider
, former Nippon Professional Baseball player and current manager
, lead guitar in Concerto Moon, a Japanese neo-classical/power metal band
, Japanese film director and screenwriter
, former Japanese football player
, Japanese mixed martial artist and kickboxer known as Kid Yamamoto
, retired Japanese triple jumper

Japanese masculine given names